El Mal amor is a 1955 Argentine film directed by Luis Mottura.

Cast
Mecha Ortiz as Marcela
Ricardo Passano as Rafael
Pedro Hurtado as Félix Zaldívar
Antonia Herrero as Emilia Zaldívar
Vicky Seepol as Marta
Mateo Martínez as Doctor Sabora
Nery Smirna as Casilda
J.P. Lemos as Muchacho

External links
 

1955 films
1950s Spanish-language films
Argentine black-and-white films
Argentine romantic drama films
1955 romantic drama films
1950s Argentine films